Daniel O'Regan (born 3 February 1988 in Auckland, New Zealand) is a New Zealand rugby league player who last played for the New Zealand Warriors in the National Rugby League competition. He is the nephew of former Kiwi Ron O'Regan.

Early years
Educated at Kaipara College, and of Maori descent O'Regan played for the Mt Albert Lions in the Bartercard Cup as well as spending time at the Manurewa club, before signing with the New Zealand Warriors. In 2008 O'Regan played in the Toyota Cup and was the Junior Warriors inaugural captain. He played in twenty three matches and scored eleven tries.

New Zealand Warriors
In 2009 he was part of the wider senior Warriors squad and played with the Auckland Vulcans in the NSW Cup. He made his first grade debut for the Warriors on 5 April 2009 against the South Sydney Rabbitohs, becoming the 150th player to play for the club.

Melbourne Storm

In 2010, O'Regan joined the Melbourne Storm after the New Zealand Warriors did not renew his contract.

International career

In 2005 O'Regan was a Junior Kiwi.

References

External links
Official player profile

1988 births
Living people
Auckland rugby league team players
New Zealand rugby league players
New Zealand Warriors players
Mount Albert Lions players
Manurewa Marlins players
New Zealand Māori rugby league players
Rugby league five-eighths
Junior Kiwis players
Rugby league players from Auckland
Waitakere rugby league team players